Rautio is a Finnish surname. Notable people with the surname include:

Karl Rautio (1889–1963), Finnish composer, composer of the Anthem of the Karelo-Finnish Soviet Socialist Republic
 Roine Rautio (1934–1960), Russian composer, son of Karl Rautio
Markus Rautio (1891–1973), Finnish radio journalist and presenter
Valdemar Rautio (1921–1973), Finnish Olympic track and field athlete
Martti Rautio (1935–2017), Canadian Olympic cross-country skier
Maria Rautio (born 1957), Swedish Olympic cross-country skier
Nina Rautio (born 1957), Russian operatic soprano
Kai Rautio (born 1964), Finnish ice hockey defenceman
David Rautio (born 1985), Swedish ice hockey goaltender

Finnish-language surnames